Per Arne Nilsen (born 30 March 1961) is a Norwegian sailor. He was born in Mandal, Norway.

He participated at the 1984 Summer Olympics in Los Angeles, where he placed 21st in the dinghy class. At the 1988 Summer Olympics in Seoul he competed in the multihull class together with Carl Erik Johannessen, and the team finished sixth overall.

References

External links

1961 births
Living people
People from Mandal, Norway
People from Vest-Agder
Norwegian male sailors (sport)
Olympic sailors of Norway
Sailors at the 1984 Summer Olympics – Finn
Sailors at the 1988 Summer Olympics – Tornado
Sailors at the 1992 Summer Olympics – Tornado
Sportspeople from Agder